James Park (born 1976/1977) is an South Korean-American technology entrepreneur. He co-founded Fitbit and has been its CEO and president since September 2007. He was named in 2015 among Fortune magazine's 40 Under 40, an annual ranking of the most influential young people in business. With a net worth of $660 million estimated by Forbes, he was ranked #29 in the magazine's America's Richest Entrepreneurs Under 40 in 2015. James Park announced that Fitbit became part of Google on January 14, 2021.

Early life
He attended high school at the all-boys University School in Cleveland, Ohio. His parents owned a wig shop in downtown Cleveland.

He studied computer science as an undergraduate at Harvard College but dropped out his junior year to pursue his own business.

Career 
Out of college, he co-founded an e-commerce site that managed to raise a few million dollars. The company folded during the dot com crash.

Park co-founded Fitbit with Eric Friedman on March 26, 2007 after according to a Forbes profile "realizing the potential of sensors on the Wii remote such as accelerometers paired with smaller and smaller devices." The co-founders started with an initial investment of $400,000 contributed by them and others but realized one year after starting that more funds would be needed for a product launch. They were able to get additional funding from SoftTech VC and True Ventures. Park found the initial stages of developing the product to be tough, especially in finding a hardware manufacturer. He recalled the search for the right supplier and organizing the production line in Asia left the company "pretty close to being dead."

Personal life 
Forbes estimated that Park and Friedman each made $150 million before taxes when Fitbit was acquired by Google in 2019.

Park is of Korean descent.

References

Living people
People from San Francisco
People from Cleveland
American people of Korean descent
American technology company founders
Year of birth missing (living people)
1970s births
University School alumni